Bob Livingston (born Robert Lynn Livingston November 26, 1948) is an American singer-songwriter, guitarist, bass player, and a founding member of The Lost Gonzo Band. Livingston was a key figure in the Cosmic Cowboy, progressive country and outlaw country movements that distinguished the Austin, Texas music scene in the 1970s. Over the years, Bob Livingston has gained a reputation as a band leader, solo artist, session musician and sideman in folk, Americana and country music. He has toured without stop for 47 years, and is one of the most experienced and world traveled musicians in all of Texas music. Livingston's CD, Gypsy Alibi, released by New Wilderness Records in 2011, won the "Album of the Year" at the Texas Music Awards. In January 2016, Livingston was inducted into the Texas Music Legends Hall of Fame in 2016 and into the West Texas Music Walk of Fame in 2018. Howlin' Dog Records released Livingston's latest CD, Up The Flatland Stairs, January 10, 2018.

Early life
Livingston was born in San Antonio, Texas, but was raised in Lubbock. By the mid-1960s, he was active on the Lubbock music scene that was blossoming at the time along with several other Texas music artists such as Jimmy Dale Gilmore, Joe Ely, Butch Hancock, Terry Allen, Jesse Taylor and David Halley. Livingston sharpened his skills as a guitarist and singer while attending Lubbock High and Texas Tech University. In 1968, he opened a folk club in Lubbock called The Attic, and shortly afterwards left Lubbock to pursue his own career in music.

American music career
Livingston left Lubbock in 1969 and moved to  Red River, New Mexico. There, he met a folk group called Three Faces West, whose members included Texas artist Ray Wylie Hubbard, Rick Fowler and Wayne Kidd. While playing in Aspen, Colorado in 1970, Livingston was discovered by talent scout and artist agent, Randy Fred, and was signed to Capitol Records. After meeting fellow Texas musician Michael Murphey in California, Livingston moved to Wrightwood, California and collaborated in a songwriting venture with Murphey, forming a music publishing company called Mountain Music Farm with other songwriters Roger Miller and Guy Clark. Livingston joined Michael Murphey's band playing bass, touring and recording together on Murphey's albums Geronimo's Cadillac and Cosmic Cowboy Souvenir.

By 1971, Livingston had relocated to Austin, Texas and was playing in a band that switched between Michael Murphey and Jerry Jeff Walker. 
Eventually, Murphey and Walker's interchangeable band condensed into their own group, called The Lost Gonzo Band. With Murphey and Walker, The Lost Gonzo Band helped bring about the progressive country genre, and along with the redneck rock and outlaw country movements, helpred define a distinct "Austin Sound". Livingston and the Lost Gonzo Band lent their talents to Jerry Jeff Walker for his seminal album Viva Terlingua, among many other records in Walker's career. The Lost Gonzo Band recorded three nationally released albums with Capitol Records and MCA. The Lost Gonzo band returned for shows in 2021 and 2022.

Songwriting success
Bob Livington's songs have appeared in The Lost Gonzo Band's albums, his solo records, and in Jerry Jeff Walker's albums throughout Walker's career. Songs for Walker include "Public Domain" (1975 Ridin' High) (co-written with Gary P. Nunn), "Head Full of Nothin'" (co-written with Rick Fowler), and "It's a Good Night for Singing" (1976 It's a Good Night for Singing), "Roll on Down the Road" (1977 A Man Must Carry On), "Bittersweet" (1981 Reunion), "Gonzo Compadres" (1993 Viva Luckenbach), "Life's Too Short" (1996 Scamp), "Wanted for Love" co-written with Lane Bybee (1998 Cowboy Boots and Bathing Suits).

In 2004, American rap artist Lloyd Banks of G-Unit recorded a song titled "Warrior" on his debut album The Hunger for More. The rapper's song contained a music sample of "Hold On", a song written by Livingston and Ray Wylie Hubbard and recorded by the Lost Gonzo Band but never formally released (but it was released by McKendree Spring on their 1975 album, Get Me to the Country). "Warrior" reached No. 1 on the Billboard 200 charts and went platinum.

Livingston's song "Love Cannot Be Broken" was in the soundtrack of Nobelity- a documentary about the world as seen through the eyes of various Nobel laureates, directed and produced by Turk Pipkin. 2014 saw two recordings of Livingston's song "On A Dream With You" by Texas artists, Walt and Tina Wilkins, on their new "Be Mine" CD and by beloved Texas turned Santa Fe singer/song stylist, Bill Hearne, on his latest CD, "All That's Real."

"Cowgirl's Lullaby", co-written by Livingston and Andy Wilkinson was featured in the independent film, Barracuda produced in Austin 2017. It was also recorded by Wilkinson and appears on Livingston's new CD, "Up The Flatland Stairs."

International music career
Livingston has toured abroad since 1982 playing in the UK, Switzerland, Norway, Finland, France, Canada and Mexico. Beginning in 1987, Livingston began a series of music tours sponsored by the U.S. State Department. Acting as an ambassador of American music, he has been sent repeatedly to over 25 different countries throughout the Middle East, Africa, and Asia, with an aim to promote goodwill and cross-cultural understanding through musical exchange. Livingston has toured Yemen, Bahrain, Oman, Syria, Kuwait, Qatar, India, Pakistan, Sri Lanka, Bangladesh, Vietnam, Thailand, Morocco, Tunisia and Angola, among others. These tours began as a solo act, but eventually included such musicians as long-time associate and guitarist John Inmon, fiddler Richard Bowden, and Livingston's son, guitarist and composer, Tucker Livingston. Livingston and his son gave performances and workshops on the art of guitar playing, songwriting craft, and a history of Texas music and folklore. The Livingstons regularly invited local musicians onstage to collaborate with their indigenous instruments. Editing and pre-production of a documentary film of these travels are currently in the works.  Livingston has played and collaborated with groups as diverse as Nepal's, Sur Sudha, The Royal Omani Orchestra, with Ood players in the Middle East, Geisha singers in Vietnam, sitar and tabla players in India and Angola drums and choir ensembles.

Texas Music International (TMI) and Cowboys and Indians
In 2000, Livingston created, Texas Music International, an organization dedicated to bringing different musics of the world together for human and cultural harmony. His first venture was to create a multi-cultural group of musicians from Texas and India called Cowboys & Indians. Cowboys & Indians is supported by the Texas Commission on the Arts and the Economic Development Department of Austin. They give public performances and educational workshops and performances in Texas schools and theaters. Mixed instrumentation, music and cultural lore fuse with Native American, Texas folk and Indian themes that include Bharatanatyam dance, Native American flute and story song, Hindu mythology and cowboy yodeling.  Based in Austin, members of Cowboys & Indians have included Bradley Kopp, Oliver Rajamani, Richard Bowden, Tucker Livingston, singer Nagavalli,  and Bharatnatyam dancer Anu Naimpally.

Recent ventures
Livingston's discography spans beyond progressive country, singer-songwriter and rock music to such myriad recordings as film music for The Texas Chain Saw massacre, environmental and peace activist albums, and a children's record on A Gentle Wind called, Open The Window. During his career, Bob has performed with a long list of musicians: Jerry Jeff Walker, Michael Martin Murphey, Ray Wylie Hubbard, Willie Nelson, Willis Alan Ramsey, Leon Russell, and Garth Brooks. He has acted as Chairman of the Austin Music Commission, and serves on the board of directors at the Texas Music Museum.
In 2009, Bob Livingston completed another tour sponsored by the U.S. State Department to France, Switzerland and several nations in Africa and in February 2017 played in Karachi, Pakistan. He currently lives in Austin and continues his work with Cowboys & Indians, The Lost Gonzo Band and on his solo career. Livingston's newest CD, Gypsy Alibi was co-produced by Livingston and Lloyd Maines and released on January 27, 2011, on New Wilderness Records.  On July 9, 2011, Gypsy Alibi, won "Album of the Year" at the Texas Music Awards. Livingston's latest CD Up The Flatland Stairs, a collection of songs for Howlin' Dog Records, is set to be released in the summer of 2017.

Livingston as Author
Bob Livingston is currently writing a book for Texas Tech University Press about his life and travels through the lens of his music career. Expected publishing date, 2023.

Discography

Solo
 Waking Up (Wilderness); 1981
 Signs of Life (Wilderness); 1988
 Open the Window (Gentle Wind); 1996
 Mahatma Gandhi & Sitting Bull (Vireo); 2003
 Everything Is All Right (TMI); 2004
 Cowboys & Indians (Vireo); 2007
 Original Spirit (Vireo); 2008
 Gypsy Alibi (New Wilderness Records); 2011
 Bob Livingston at the Kerrville Folk Festival (FestivaLink); 2011
 Up The Flatland Stairs (Howlin' Dog Records); 2018

With The Lost Gonzo Band
 The Lost Gonzo Band (MCA); 1972
 Thrills (MCA); 1976
 Signs of Life (Capitol); 1978
 Rendezvous (Vireo); 1991
 Hands of Time (Vireo); 1995
 Dead Armadillos (Demon/Edsel); 1998

With Jerry Jeff Walker
 Jerry Jeff Walker (MCA); 1972
 Viva Terlingua! (MCA); 1973
 Walker's Collectibles (MCA); 1974
 Ridin’ High (MCA); 1975
 It's a Good Night for Singin’ (MCA); 1976
 A Man Must Carry On (MCA); 1977
 Great Gonzos (MCA); 1991
 Navaho Rug (Rycodisk); 1991
 Hill Country Rain (Rycodisk); 1992
 Viva Luckenbach (Rycodisk); 1993
 Christmas Gonzo Style (Rycodisk); 1994
 Night After Night (Tried ‘n True); 1995
 Scamp (Tried ‘n True); 1996
 Cowboy Boots and Bathing Suits (Tried ‘n True); 1997
 Lone Wolf: The Best of Jerry Jeff Walker (Elektra); 1998
 Gypsy Songman (Tried ‘n True); 1999
 Gonzo Stew (Tried ‘n True); 2001
 Too Old to Change (Tried ' True) 2003
  It's A Good Night For Singin' & Contrary To Ordinary Plus (Raven); 2013

With Michael Martin Murphey
 Geronimo’s Cadillac (A&M); 1972
 Cosmic Cowboy Souvenir (A&M); 1973

With Ray Wylie Hubbard
 Something About the Night (Renegade); 1979
 Loco Gringo's Lament (Dejadisc); 1994

With Bobby Bridger
 Seekers of the Fleece (Golden Egg); 1975
 Ballad of the West (Golden Egg); 2001
 Complete Works (Golden Egg); 2004

With Steven Fromholz
 Steven Fromholz (Capitol); 1977
 Frummox II (ABC Probe);1982

With Bill Oliver
 Texas Oasis 1980 (Live Oak)
 Better Things to Do 1986 (Live Oak)
 Audubon Adventures 1987 (Live Oak)
 Have to Have a Habitat 1995 (Live Oak)
 Friend of the River 2001 (Live Oak)

With Butch Hancock
 Yella Rose (with Marce Lacouture)(Rainlight); 1985
 Own & Own (Demon); 1989
 Own the Way Over Here (Sugar Hill); 1993

With Terry Allen
 The Moral Minority (Fate); 1995

With Pat Green
 Carry On (Greenhorse); 2000
 Three Days (Universal); 2001

With Gary P. Nunn
 Under My Hat (1996)

Other artists
 Peter Caulton: Hard Road Tough Country (1998)
 Cory Morrow: Outside the Lines (2002)
 Mark David Manders: Highs and Lows (2002)
 Owen Temple: General Store (1997)
 Owen Temple: Two Thousand Miles (2007)
 Larry Joe Taylor: Heart of the Matter (2000)
 Various Artists Kerrville Folk Festival: Early Years 1972–1981
 Various Artists: Stranger Than Fiction (1999)
 Chris Wall: Cowboy Nation (1999)
 Susan Herndon "All Fall Down" (2012)

Notes

References
 Robinson, Bruce "Ragabilly Rocker", Bohemian.com, April 15, 2009
 Bob Livingston article in Lone Star Music Magazine: I Was There! The Making of Viva Terlingua

External links
Bob Livingston's website
Bob Livingston on Facebook

The "Wild East": https://www.youtube.com/watch?v=ms1fP_JpMJA ]  
 Bob Livingston's Open the Window children's record
Interview on the ATX Architects Podcast

American country singer-songwriters
1948 births
Living people
Singer-songwriters from Texas
Musicians from San Antonio
People from Wrightwood, California
Texas Tech University alumni
Lubbock High School alumni
Country musicians from Texas
Country musicians from California
Singer-songwriters from California